"On My Way (Marry Me)" is a song by American singer Jennifer Lopez recorded for the soundtrack 2022 film Marry Me. The song was released on November 18, 2021, by Universal Studios and Sony Music Latin.

Three more versions of the songs were released. First is On My Way (Marry Me) [TELYKast Remix] which is also in the soundtrack album and the country version of the song stylized as on my way, a duet with Jimmie Allen which is included in his album Tulip Drive. Another remix of the song was released entitled On My Way (Marry Me) [David Solomon Remix].

It is the winner of the Best Song award at the 2022 MTV Movie & TV Awards. It is also nominated at the 13th Hollywood Music in Media Awards under the Song – Onscreen Performance (Film) category.

Music video

Lyric video
An official lyric video, showing scenes from the Marry Me movie directed by Kat Coiro, was released on November 22, 2021.

Official video
The music video for "On My Way" was directed by Santiago Salviche and released on December 3, 2021.

Remix video
On February 13, 2022, Lopez released a second video for the song's official remix featuring TELYKast.

Valentine's Day Remix video

The video was released on February 12, 2022 and included in Jennifer‘s first OntheJLo Email. Ben Affleck directed and gifted it to Jennifer, showing that he and Jennifer have been on their way to each other.

Critical reception
George Millington of GSG Media gave the song 4 out of 5 stars, describing it as "Lopez's most gripping song to date", one that "plucks at the heartstrings right away." He complimented Lopez's vocals, writing that "the multitalented singer and actress proves why she is still one of the best singers ever to grace the airwaves." He added: "Jennifer is a vocal behemoth and she rises to the occasion with unforgivable charm. Her tones are lovely, and her unique and sweet singing approach soothes the spirit." According to themusicalhype.com, the song is "a respectable, well-rounded single; Lopez sings beautifully and her tone is well-suited for this record, and she achieves the right feels." They also added that "the chorus features the best songwriting and vocals from Lopez who "serves up some nice nuances and ad-libs, including a little falsetto."

Live performances
Lopez performed the song live for the first time during her set at the Global Citizen Live concert, which took place in New York City on September 25, 2021. Lopez performed the song again during the American Music Awards of 2021, at the Microsoft Theater in Los Angeles on November 21, 2021. Lopez performed the song on The Voice finale in Los Angeles on December 14, 2021.

Accolades

Charts

Release history

References

2021 singles
2021 songs
2020s ballads
Jennifer Lopez songs
Songs written for films
Sony Music Latin singles
Pop ballads
Songs written by Michael Pollack (musician)
Songs written by Leroy Clampitt
Songs written by Ivy Adara